The CHL Scholastic Player of the Year Award is awarded annually to the Canadian Hockey League player who is best combines success on the ice with success in school. It is chosen from the winners of the constituent league awards; the Daryl K. (Doc) Seaman Trophy  of the Western Hockey League, the Marcel Robert Trophy of the Quebec Major Junior Hockey League, or the Bobby Smith Trophy of the Ontario Hockey League.

Winners
List of winners of the CHL Scholastic Player of the Year Award.

See also
 List of Canadian Hockey League awards

References

External links
 CHL Awards – CHL

Canadian Hockey League trophies and awards
Student athlete awards